Cryoturris is a genus of sea snails, marine gastropod mollusks in the family Mangeliidae.

Description
The shell is small or medium-sized, slender or moderately slender. The whorls are angulated at the periphery or rounded. The protoconch is slender or moderately slender, the apex generally rising abruptly, consisting of about 2 or 3 whorls. The body whorl or half whorl bears curved, protractive axial riblets and generally bulges at its periphery. The aperture is moderately narrow. The  anterior canal is very short or hardly differentiated, slightly emarginate. The outer lip is simple, except at intervals corresponding to position of varixlike ribs. The anal notch is wide, shallow, or moderately deep. The sculpture consists of axial ribs, overridden by fine spiral threads and by microscopic frosted spiral threads.

This genus is the tropical representation of the temperate genus Kurtziella with a similar aperture and sculpture.

Species
Species within the genus Cryoturris include:
 Cryoturris adamsii (E. A. Smith, 1884)
 Cryoturris albida (C.B. Adams, 1845)
 † Cryoturris aptera  W.P. Woodring, 1928 
 Cryoturris cerinella (Dall, 1889)
 Cryoturris citronella (Dall, 1886)
 Cryoturris daidalea Gardner J.A., 1947 
 † Cryoturris dianema Woodring, 1928
 † Cryoturris dominicensis  (W.M. Gabb, 1873)
 Cryoturris edithae (Usticke, 1971)
 † Cryoturris etrema  W.P. Woodring, 1928 
 † Cryoturris euengonia  W.P. Woodring, 1928  
 Cryoturris fargoi McGinty, 1955
 † Cryoturris habra  W.P. Woodring, 1970 
 Cryoturris lavalleana (d' Orbigny, 1847)
 † Cryoturris magnoliana chariessa Gardner, 1948 
 † Cryoturris nexilis  W.P. Woodring, 1928
 Cryoturris quadrilineata (C. B. Adams, 1850)
 † Cryoturris serta  A.A. Olsson & A. Harbison, 1953
 Cryoturris vincula (Usticke, 1969)
 Species brought into synonymy
 Cryoturris diadema W.P. Woodring, 1928 : synonym of Cryoturris dianema  W.P. Woodring, 1928
 Cryoturris dorvilliae (Reeve, 1845): synonym of Kurtziella dorvilliae (Reeve, 1845)
 Cryoturris elata (Dall, 1889): synonym of Platycythara elata (Dall, 1889)
 Cryoturris filifera (Dall, 1881): synonym of Gymnobela filifera (Dall, 1881)
 Cryoturris serga (Dall, 1881): synonym of Kurtziella serga (Dall, 1881)
 Cryoturris trilineata (Adams C. B., 1845): synonym of Tenaturris trilineata (C. B. Adams, 1845)

References

 W. P. Woodring. 1928. Miocene Molluscs from Bowden, Jamaica. Part 2: Gastropods and discussion of results . Contributions to the Geology and Palaeontology of the West Indies

External links
  Tucker, J.K. 2004 Catalog of recent and fossil turrids (Mollusca: Gastropoda). Zootaxa 682:1-1295.
 Worldwide Mollusc Species Data Base: Mangeliidae

 
Gastropod genera